Faizal Raffi (born 20 January 1996) is a Singaporean footballer who plays as a central midfielder for Singapore Premier League club Balestier Khalsa.

Club career

Balestier Khalsa
In 2015, Raffi started his career with Balestier Khalsa Football Club and was named on the bench seven times in the season. He failed to make an appearance that season.

Tampines Rovers
He signed with the Stag's prime league squad.

Career statistics

. Caps and goals may not be correct

References

External links

Singaporean footballers
Association football midfielders
Singapore Premier League players
Young Lions FC players
1996 births
Living people